Randia portoricensis, known commonly as the Puerto Rico indigoberry, is a species of shrub in the family Rubiaceae. It is endemic to Puerto Rico, and is found in thickets and semi-dry forests.

References

portoricensis
Endemic flora of Puerto Rico
Flora without expected TNC conservation status